Metro Manila is a 2013 British independently-produced crime drama film directed by Sean Ellis, set in the Philippines and with dialogue mainly in Tagalog. Ellis also co-produced and co-wrote the film. The film was selected as the British entry for the Best Foreign Language Film at the 86th Academy Awards, but was not nominated.

Plot
Oscar Ramirez is a rice farmer who lives in Banaue with his wife Mai and their children Angel and Baby. When his rice crops are no longer profitable, he relocates his family to Metro Manila in hopes of obtaining a higher quality of life. While searching for a job, Oscar is offered a low-cost room to rent. However, the next day his family is evicted by the police from the apartment building for squatting. The room was a scam set up by conmen.

The family move into a vacant shanty house in the slums of Tondo while Oscar secures a job as a security officer for Manila Armored Couriers after the other guards discover his military background. He befriends his senior officer Ong and quickly bonds with his co-workers while earning the respect of Buddha, the president of the armoured truck company. On Oscar's first day at work, Ong tells him he lost his previous partner during a failed robbery six months prior. Ong is also concerned about Oscar's residence in Tondo, which is a hotbed for criminals. One night, Oscar tells Ong the story of Alfred Santos, a man who held up an airliner and jumped off the plane to his death after losing his father and his family's silk factory to a rival company. Oscar feels responsible, as he had previously worked at the factory and did not stand up for his former employer. Ong offers Oscar a spare apartment unit in Makati for his family to live in. Meanwhile, Mai lands a job as a bar hostess at a nightclub in Makati. While undergoing the mandatory physical checkup, she is revealed to be pregnant. Mai quickly learns of the hardships she must endure as a bar hostess. When she fails to make her drink quota and her pregnancy becomes more evident, her boss proposes to have nine-year-old Angel work for special clients.

During a routine job, Oscar discovers that the client is a drug dealer and sees Ong take a handout for the delivery. The duo have a tense discussion on the corruption that shrouds Metro Manila. When Ong pulls over to find a wall to urinate on, Oscar suddenly sees a black Honda Civic pull over with a group of men headed toward Ong's direction. Going against his protocol, he exits the armoured van and follows the gang on foot, only to discover that they are in cahoots with Ong. After the gang leaves, Ong reveals to Oscar that after the failed robbery, he took one of the security boxes with him, and he is plotting with the gang to have the box opened by staging a robbery and having himself "debriefed" in the company's processing centre while Oscar makes an imprint of the key in another room. He also threatens to blackmail Oscar with the truth about his wife working as a bar hostess, as well as the clever scheme of renting out the spare apartment under Oscar's name and hiding the box there. Just as Ong prepares to surrender the box, he realizes that the robber in front of him is not part of the gang but the man who escaped when his former partner was killed. The man guns him down and runs away while the gang speeds off. Oscar is then given the grievous task of "postman", having to deliver Ong's personal effects and severance pay to his wife. He does not disclose Ong's plot to Buddha. As per company procedure, his pay is suspended until the investigation is closed.

Upon learning that Ong's wife is aware of the security box, Oscar races back home and finds it under the floor. He and Mai face the dilemma of what to do with the box as she tells him it was a mistake for them to move to the city. One night, after a job, Oscar sneaks into the processing centre and takes an imprint of the key while stealing another one, but is quickly caught on security camera by Buddha and immediately cornered. He is shot in the chest and dies with the key in his hand. Misled by the different key Oscar stole, the company rushes armed men to the address of the drug dealer client while JJ, Oscar's new partner, becomes the "postman" to deliver Oscar's personal effects to Mai. She notices a locket that Oscar had stolen from a shop earlier that morning; upon opening it, she discovers a clay imprint of the key to the security box. After getting the key duplicated, she leaves the city with her children by bus. A rucksack full of money sits between her feet.

Cast
 Jake Macapagal as Oscar Ramirez
 Althea Vega as Mai Ramirez
 John Arcilla as Ong
 Erin Panlilio as Angel Ramirez
 Iasha Aceio as Baby Ramirez
 Moises Mag Isa as Buddha
 Angelina Kanapi as Charlie
 JM Rodriguez as Alfred Santos
 Ana Abad Santos as Dora Ong
 Reuben Uy as JJ
 Ann Estrada as Bridget
 Leon Miguel as White-eyed Man

Production
Director Sean Ellis took inspiration from his first trip to the Philippines when he witnessed two armoured truck drivers arguing with each other.

The film was shot on location in the Philippines in 2011 with a Filipino cast and crew members. The script was written in English, but Ellis encouraged the cast to interpret their lines in Filipino. Ellis used a Canon EOS 5D DSLR camera to capture the footage.

The story of Alfred Santos is based on the Philippine Airlines Flight 812 hijacking on 25 May 2000.

Release
Metro Manila had its International premiere at the 2013 Sundance Film Festival on 20 January 2013. It was also released on 17 July 2013 in France, 28 August 2013 in Belgium, 29 August 2013 in the Netherlands, and 20 September 2013 in the UK. It had its Philippine premiere on 9 October 2013.

The film was re-released with special screenings to raise money for the victims of Typhoon Haiyan/Yolanda that had hit the Philippines and killed close to 6000 people. Ellis said: "The people of the Philippines were tremendously supportive during the making of Metro Manila, and it's only right that we should now use the film to raise money to help the victims of this terrible disaster."

Critical reception
Rotten Tomatoes lists a rating of 94% based on 32 reviews as of August 2019. The consensus reads "Infusing thriller tropes with a searing glimpse of modern-day corruption, Metro Manila is just as gripping as any action blockbuster ⁠— and twice as thought-provoking."

After winning the Hamburg Film Critic Award at the 2013 Filmfest Hamburg, the jury said of the film: "The themes of our times are what define this film: rural exodus and impoverishment, exploitation and poverty in the Moloch of overcrowded metropolises. Director Sean Ellis filmed this story in a language that is foreign to him - and yet still always manages to hit the right tone. He is emotional, yet never impassioned; poetic, yet never tawdry; raw without any hint of cynicism. A social drama that becomes a thriller, breathless and unstoppable. "Metro Manila" deserves to be seen by many. This film belongs in the cinema. ..."

Acclaimed Spanish director Pedro Almodóvar listed the film as one of his personal favorite films of 2013.

Accolades
At the 2013 British Independent Film Awards (BIFA) Metro Manila was nominated in five categories and won awards for Achievement in Production, Best Director and Best British independent film.

See also
 CityLights - The 2014 Indian remake
 List of submissions to the 86th Academy Awards for Best Foreign Language Film
 List of British submissions for the Academy Award for Best Foreign Language Film

References

External links
 

2013 films
2013 crime drama films
2010s heist films
British crime drama films
British heist films
British independent films
Filipino-language films
Films about aviation accidents or incidents
Films about drugs
Films about poverty
Films about prostitution in the Philippines
Films set in Metro Manila
Films set in Ifugao
Films shot in Metro Manila
British pregnancy films
Squatting in film
Sundance Film Festival award winners
2013 independent films
2010s British films